The Achumawi language (also Achomawi or Pit River language) is the indigenous language spoken by the Pit River people in the northeast corner of present-day California. The term Achumawi is an anglicization of the name of the Fall River band, ajúmmááwí, from ajúmmá "river". Originally there were nine bands, with dialect differences primarily between upriver (Atwamwi, Astariwawi; Kosalektawi, Hammawi, Hewisedawi dialects) and downriver (Madesiwi, Itsatawi, Ilmawi, and Achumawi (proper) dialects), demarcated by the Big Valley mountains east of the Fall River valley.

Genetic relationships

Together, Achumawi and Atsugewi are said to comprise the Palaihnihan language family separate from the adjacent and related Shastan family. The basis of this grouping is weakened by poor quality of data. David Olmsted's data dictionary depends almost entirely upon de Angulo, and carelessly includes Pomo vocabulary from a manuscript in which he (de Angulo) set out to demonstrate that Achumawi and Pomo are not related. William Bright and Shirley Silver questioned Olmsted's results and methods of reconstruction. Kroeber (1925:279) acknowledged that
  The phenomenon of non-reciprocal intelligibility is a matter of bilingualism in the smaller and more dependent of two exogamous communities; Kroeber (1925:308) estimated that the Achumawi were ten times more numerous than the Atsugewi.

Phonology  

Achumawi has 29 consonants. The stops and affricate (aside from the marginally contrastive glottal stop) are in three series, plain, aspirated, and laryngealized or glottalized. The aspirated series is contrastive only syllable-initially and probably derives historically from the voiceless-released first member of a consonant cluster, as in the neighboring and possibly related Yana language. This is seen morphophonemically in e.g. it "I, me", itʰˑú "my, mine".

The plain-aspirated distinction is neutralized and realized with voiceless release in syllable-final position and before another consonant; the aspirates are much more fortis than this voiceless release. Syllable-initial plain stops are voiceless (without voiceless release) after long vowel or when geminate (long), and voiced elsewhere. The laryngealized stops are similar in articulation to the ejective glottalized stops of neighboring languages, but more lenis, that is, not "popped" unless an unusual effort is made at articulating the distinction.

The language has a 5-vowel system /i e a o u/. Two degrees of length are contrastive for both vowels and consonants. Long vowels are typically more peripheral and short vowels more centralized, phonetically [ɪ ɛ ʌ ə ʊ]. The mid vowels /e o/ are probably of secondary origin historically, as in Yana and Atsugewi. A short centralized vowel [ə ɨ] appears epenthetically between the consonants of certain prefixes, as in lhúpta "let's go!". Vowel length assimilates the next successive laryngeal state, that is, the second mora of a long vowel is devoiced before a plain or aspirated consonant (preaspiration) and word finally before silence, and is laryngealized before a laryngealized consonant. In upriver dialects vowels and plain stops are more fully voiced. In downriver dialects, utterance-final syllables may be devoiced or whispered, especially under interrogative intonation. A light syllable consists of a consonant and vowel (CV), and a heavy syllable either contains a long vowel (CVˑ) or is closed with a second consonant (CVC).

Unlike the neighboring and related language Atsugewi, Achumawi has contrastive high and low tones.

Morphology 

The Achumawi language does not have gender but it has two forms of the copula ("to be") distinguishing animate and inanimate. The verb stem comprises one or more verb roots plus optional adverbial affixes. Inflectional affixes on verbs distinguish singular, dual, and plural number, and suffixes may optionally express severality and plurality of nouns. Many nouns and adjectives are derived from verb stems or participles, and some verb stems are formed by noun incorporation. The language has independent adjectives and numerals.

Current status

Today, the Achumawi language is critically endangered. Out of an estimated 1500 Achumawi people remaining in northeastern California, perhaps ten spoke the language in 1991, with only eight in 2000. 

As of 2013, a mobile app was planned for the language.
Louise Davis, who lives in northern California, is almost tearful when she describes hearing people using the language of her Pit River tribe in conversation for the first time. It happened years ago when an older man from another part of the state met up with her grandmother.

It was such a powerful, emotional experience that Davis is driven to use flashcards at home with her children and do whatever it takes to preserve the language.

“You can say things in our language that you can’t say in English,” she said.

Testing out a language app in February [2013], she said she couldn’t wait to see it being used among young people in the tribe.

References

Bibliography
Bright, William. (1965). "[Review of A history of Palaihnihan phonology by D. L. Olmsted]." Language, 41 (1), 175–178.
Bauman, James. 1980. Introduction to the Pit River language and culture. Anchorage, AK: National Bilingual Materials Development Center, University of Alaska.
Good, Jeff. (2004). "A sketch of Atsugewi phonology." Boston, Massachusetts. (Paper presented at the annual meeting of the Society for the Study of the Indigenous Languages of the Americas, January 8 – January 11).
Good, Jeff, Teresa McFarland, and Mary Paster. (2003). "Reconstructing Achumawi and Atsugewi: Proto-Palaihnihan revisited." Atlanta, Georgia. (Paper presented at the annual meeting of the Society for the Study of the Indigenous Languages of the Americas, January 2 – January 5).
Kroeber, Alfred L. 1925. Handbook of the Indians of California. Smithsonian Institution, Bureau of American Ethnology, Bulletin No. 78.
Mithun, Marianne. (1999). The Languages of Native North America. Cambridge: Cambridge University Press.  (hbk); .
Nevin, Bruce E. (1991). "Obsolescence in Achumawi: Why Uldall Too?". Papers from the American Indian Languages Conferences, held at the University of California, Santa Cruz, July and August 1991. Occasional Papers on Linguistics 16:97-127. Department of Linguistics, Southern Illinois University at Carbondale.
Nevin, Bruce E. (1998). Aspects of Pit River phonology. Ph.D. dissertation, University of Pennsylvania, Department of Linguistics.
Nevin, Bruce E. (In review). "Why Proto-Palaihnihan is neither". 10.13140/RG.2.2.33917.20966.
Olmsted, David L. (1954). "Achumawi-Atsugewi non-reciprocal intelligibility." International Journal of American Linguistics, 20, 181–184.
Olmsted, David L. (1956). "Palaihnihan and Shasta I: Labial stops." Language, 32 (1), 73–77.
Olmsted, David L. (1957). "Palaihnihan and Shasta II: Apical stops." Language, 33 (2), 136–138.
Olmsted, David L. (1959). "Palaihnihan and Shasta III: Dorsal stops." Language, 35 (4), 637–644.
Olmsted, David L. (1964). "A history of Palaihnihan phonology." University of California Publications in Linguistics (Vol. 35). Berkeley: University of California Press.

Dictionaries 
Bauman, James. Ruby Miles, and Ike Leaf. Pit River Teaching Dictionary. Anchorage, AK: National Bilingual Materials Development Center, University of Alaska.
Olmsted, D. L. 1966. Achumawi dictionary. Berkeley: University of California Press.

External links
 Bruce Nevin (Achumawi database, texts, and Android app)
 Bruce Nevin (1998) Aspects of Pit River Phonology
 Jeff Good, Teresa McFarland & Mary Paster (2003) "Reconstructing Achumawi and Atsugewi"
 Achumawi language overview at the Survey of California and Other Indian Languages
 
OLAC Resources in and about the Achumawi language
Pit River (2022)  ('A Treasury of Rare and Unusual Languages' podcast, episode 1). MLX (Minority Language eXperience).
 

Critically endangered languages
Pit River tribes
Palaihnihan languages
Indigenous languages of California
Endangered indigenous languages of the Americas